This is a list of the French SNEP Top 100 CD Singles, Top 50 Digital Singles, Top 200 CD Albums & Top 50 Digital Albums number-ones of 2009.

Number-ones by week

Singles chart

1 SNEP decides to take into account also downloads on mobile phones. 
2 Downloads on mobile phones are no longer taken into account in the charts.

Albums chart

Top ten best sales
This is the ten best-selling of physical singles, digital singles, physical albums and digital albums in 2009.

Singles & Downloads

*Only in 2009
**Internet + Mobile Phones

Albums & Downloads

*Only in 2009

See also
2009 in music
List of number-one hits (France)
List of artists who reached number one on the French Singles Chart

References

Number-one hits
France
2009